is a former Japanese cyclist.

Major results
2003
 1st Overall Tour de Hokkaido
1st Stage 3
2006
 1st Stage 4 Herald Sun Tour
 3rd Team time trial, Asian Games
2007
 1st Stage 7 Tour de Taiwan
2008
 2nd Overall Tour de Kumano
1st Stage 1

References

External links

1976 births
Living people
Japanese male cyclists
Asian Games medalists in cycling
Cyclists at the 2006 Asian Games
Asian Games bronze medalists for Japan
Medalists at the 2006 Asian Games